The CSIR Fourth Paradigm Institute (CSIR-4PI) formerly CMMACS is a unit of the Council of Scientific and Industrial Research. The centre is involved in developing modelling approaches for illuminating the structure and evolution of complex systems.

History
In the late 1980s the Council of Scientific and Industrial Research realised the increasing importance of mathematical modelling and computer based simulations that were critical for understanding complex systems, which were used in a wide array of scientific research. Various fields that were previously thought to be purely observational and qualitative now needed the use of such technologies.

It was established in 1988 in the Belur Campus of the National Aerospace Laboratories (NAL), Bengaluru. The current Head of the Institute is Dr. Sridevi Jade.

Academics
The institute offers opportunities of summer projects for B.E. / M.Sc. / M.Tech students twice a year.

References

Council of Scientific and Industrial Research
Research institutes in Bangalore
Organizations established in 1988
Computer science institutes
1988 establishments in Karnataka